Marjorie Yang Mun-tak GBS (born 1952) is Chairwoman of Esquel Group, a Hong Kong-based textile and apparel manufacturer with operations throughout the world, producing over 110 million cotton shirts every year for well-acclaimed brands and retailers such as Ralph Lauren, Tommy Hilfiger, Hugo Boss, Nike, and Marks and Spencer.

Career
Yang is of Wu County, Jiangsu descent. She has served as its chairwoman since 1995. From 2008 to 2014, Yang oversaw a rapid expansion of the family business she inherited, more than doubling its revenue to US$1.4 billion.

In China, Yang has been a Member of the National Committee of the Chinese People's Political Consultative Conference since 2003. In Hong Kong, she is Chairman of the Hong Kong-United States Business Council, Chairperson of the Government's Advisory Committee on Admission of Quality Migrants and Professionals as well as a member of the Government's Commission on Strategic Development. In addition, Marjorie serves as Deputy Chairman of the Seoul International Business Advisory Council.

Yang is also on the boards of The HSBC and Swire Pacific as Independent non-executive director. In addition, she is a Member of Christie's Asia Advisory Board.

In 2017, Yang financially backed former finance minister and colleague John Tsang for the position of Chief Executive of Hong Kong, though he eventually lost to Carrie Lam.

Yang is a Member of the various advisory boards at:
 MIT Corporation
 Chairman of the Council of the Hong Kong Polytechnic University
 Member of the Board of Governors at the Asia School of Business
 Harvard University
 Harvard Business School
 MIT Sloan School of Management
 Tsinghua University School of Economics and Management
 China Europe International Business School
 Shanghai Jiao Tong University Antai College of Economics & Management
 Honorary Trustee at Lingnan College of Sun Yat-sen University
 Honorary Member of the Court of the Hong Kong University of Science and Technology

Education
Yang holds a Bachelor of Science in Mathematics from the Massachusetts Institute of Technology and an MBA from Harvard Business School.

Personal life
From her marriage to businessman Dickson Poon, Yang has one child, Dee Poon. Yang brought her daughter into the Esquel Group in 2009 as chief brand officer of PYE, and Dee Poon has since become managing director of Esquel brands and distribution.

Philanthropy and environmental conservation
Her Esquel-Y.L. Yang Education Foundation has been funding the building or renovation of more than 20 schools. The Esquel Group has provided microfinance to 300 rural households in China's unrest-ridden Xinjiang region, where the privately held company has cotton farming, ginning and spinning operations. The Foundation is geared mostly towards improving the standards of teaching, encouraging education and learning, and enhancing health and public hygiene for Uyghur minority students in areas outside the regional capital, Ürümqi.  The foundation has been doing work in vision screening amongst rural children in China, and has also done work in Vietnam, and Sri Lanka.

Long an advocate for environmental conservation and sustainable production, Marjorie also chairs the Shan Shui Conservation Center and holds membership in the Advisory Council of Natural Resources Defense Council (NRDC) in China.

In 2018, Yang announced the launch of 'Integral', an initiative aimed to encourage business leaders and academics to develop a balanced and less environment-damaging growth model for China.

Recent honours and awards
 Top 50 Most Powerful Women in Business by Fortune Magazine (2000, 2004, 2005 and 2009)
 The Bronze Beaver Award by Massachusetts Institute of Technology (MIT) Alumni Association (2011) 
 48 Heroes of Philanthropy (2012)
 Asia's 50 Power Businesswomen by Forbes (2012) 
 Diamond Award by Hong Kong Tatler (2013) 
 Gold Bauhinia Star (GBS) by the Hong Kong Special Administrative Region Government (2013)

References

1952 births
Harvard Business School alumni
Hong Kong chief executives
Members of the National Committee of the Chinese People's Political Consultative Conference
HSBC people
Living people
Massachusetts Institute of Technology School of Science alumni
Swire Group
Hong Kong philanthropists
The Baldwin School alumni
Members of the Election Committee of Hong Kong, 2012–2017
Members of the Election Committee of Hong Kong, 2017–2021
Hong Kong billionaires
Female billionaires
Hong Kong textiles industry businesspeople